Tetyana Mykolayivna Berezhna (born 13 November 1982) is an archer from Ukraine.

Berezhna represented Ukraine at the 2004 Summer Olympics.  She placed 14th in the women's individual ranking round with a 72-arrow score of 640.  In the first round of elimination, she faced 51st-ranked Fotini Vavatsi of Greece.  Berezhna defeated Vavatsi, winning 160-156 in the 18-arrow match to advance to the round of 32.  In that round, she faced Jennifer Nichols of the United States, losing to the 19th-ranked archer 163-160 in the regulation 18 arrows.  Berezhna finished 18th in women's individual archery. Berezhna was also a member of the 6th-place Ukrainian team in the women's team archery competition.

At the 2008 Summer Olympics in Beijing Berezhna finished her ranking round with a total of 627 points. This gave her the 38th seed for the final competition bracket in which she faced Zhang Juanjuan in the first round. The local Chinese home favourite who was the 27th seed would win the confrontation with 109-97 and would eventually go on to win the gold medal.

References 

1982 births
Living people
Olympic archers of Ukraine
Archers at the 2004 Summer Olympics
Archers at the 2008 Summer Olympics
Ukrainian female archers
21st-century Ukrainian women